Errol Osbourne Nolan II (born August 18, 1991) is an American-born sprinter of Jamaican descent who holds dual citizenship with both countries. He now competes for Jamaica as of 2012. He specialises in the 200 and 400 metres.

Nolan attended Lamar Consolidated High School until 2009, and is now enrolled at the University of Houston. He was one of the best freshmen in Conference USA in 2010.

At the 2010 World Junior Championships in Athletics in Moncton, Canada, Nolan won a bronze medal over 400 metres, and helped the American squad to a gold medal in the 4×400 metres relay. He earned a spot in the Jamaican 4x400 relay team at the 2012 Summer Olympics, however, the Jamaican team did not qualify from their heat.

In 2014, he was part of the Jamaican  team that won bronze at the World Indoor Athletics Championships.

Personal best

References

External links

DyeStat profile for Errol Nolan
Houston Cougars bio

1991 births
Living people
American male sprinters
Jamaican male sprinters
Houston Cougars men's track and field athletes
People from Rosenberg, Texas
Olympic athletes of Jamaica
Athletes (track and field) at the 2012 Summer Olympics
American people of Jamaican descent
World Athletics Indoor Championships medalists